The Cuba Billie Jean King Cup team represents Cuba in the Billie Jean King Cup tennis competition and are governed by the Federación Cubana de Tenis de Campo. They have not competed since 2010.

History
Cuba competed in its first Fed Cup in 1991.  Their best result was reaching the 32-team main draw in 1994.

See also
Fed Cup
Cuba Davis Cup team

External links

Billie Jean King Cup teams
Fed Cup
Fed Cup